Church of All Saints is a  Grade I listed church in Sutton, Bedfordshire, England. It became a listed building on 31 October 1966.

See also
Grade I listed buildings in Bedfordshire

References

Church of England church buildings in Bedfordshire
Grade I listed churches in Bedfordshire